Debra Sue Maffett (born November 9, 1956) is an American beauty pageant titleholder from Cut and Shoot, Texas and was named Miss America 1983.

Early life and education
Maffett graduated from S.P. Waltrip High School in Houston, Texas, in 1975.

Pageantry
Although she competed in the Miss Texas pageant several years without winning, she moved to California and was subsequently crowned Miss California 1982. She represented California when she won the Miss America crown. Some controversy arose after it was revealed that Maffett underwent nasal surgery to correct her deviated septum.

Career
Maffett served as a host on PM Magazine; NBC and CBS pilots; Guinness Book of World Records with David Frost; Alive and Well; TNN Country News; Hot, Hip and Country;  Making Healthy Choices; and The Harvest Show.

In 1984, Maffett appeared as a panelist on several episodes of the Match Game Hollywood Squares Hour.

Maffett appeared in the episode of Matlock that aired December 1, 1987, entitled "The Network" as news anchor Terry McNeil.

Personal life
Maffett was married to singer Buster Wilson, until his death in 2004. Wilson had a daughter, Jenny (born 1990), from a previous relationship. Maffett gave birth to a son, Rydder, in 1996.

References

1956 births
Miss America winners
Living people
Miss America Preliminary Talent winners
Miss America Preliminary Swimsuit winners
People from Madison County, Texas
People from Nashville, Tennessee
People from Montgomery County, Texas